Wacha is a surname.

People
Notable people with the surname include:
 Dinshaw Edulji Wacha (1844–1936), Indian politician
 Michael Wacha (born 1991), American baseball player
 Jennifer Danielle Wacha alias Jennifer Sky (born 1976), American actress
 Przemysław Wacha (born 1981), Polish badminton player
 Rolf Wacha (born 1981), German rugby player

Places
 Wacha, Karnataka, settlement in Karnataka, India
 Wacha, Niger, commune in Niger

See also
 Vácha